Erika Sema and Zheng Saisai were the defending champions, having won the event in 2012, but both players decided not to participate in 2013.

Sun Ziyue and Xu Shilin won the title, defeating Yang Zhaoxuan and Zhao Yijing in the final, 6–7(5–7), 6–3, [10–3].

Seeds

Draw

References 
 Draw

Sanya - Doubles
ITF Women's Circuit – Sanya
ITF Women's Circuit Sanya Doubles